Christmas in My Home Town is a studio album by American country artist Charley Pride. It was released in November 1970 via RCA Victor Records and was produced by Jack Clement. The album was Pride's first collection of holiday music and his ninth studio recording, overall. The project originally contained ten tracks in its initial release, but was re-released with additional tracks in 2013. Christmas in My Home Town received positive reviews from critics following its release.

Background and content
By 1970, Charley Pride had several major hits after becoming country music's first commercially successful African-American artist. He had recently had five number one hits, which heightened his musical popularity: "All I Have to Offer You (Is Me)," "(I'm So) Afraid of Losing You Again," "Is Anybody Goin' to San Antone," "Wonder Could I Live There Anymore" and "I Can't Believe That You've Stopped Loving Me." Pride's commercial success prompted his record label to have him record album of Christmas music. The project was first recorded on August 27, 1969, at the RCA Victor Studio, located in Nashville, Tennessee. The sessions were originally produced by Jack Clement.

Christmas in My Home Town contained a mixture of seasonal holiday classics and original holiday tunes. The album originally contained a total of ten tracks. A re-release in later years, added three more tracks, which totaled it to 13 songs. Two of the project's tracks were composed by Pride himself: "Santa and the Kids" and "Happy Christmas Day." Other original tracks featured was the title track, which was composed by Lassaye Van Buren Holmes and "The First Christmas Morn." Holiday covers included "Silent Night," "Little Drummer Boy" and "O Holy Night."

Critical reception

Christmas in My Home Town has received positive reviews since its initial release in 1970. In a November 1970 issue of Billboard magazine, writers praised Pride's performance on the record. "Country Charley Pride has a sure winner in this top program of new and older Christmas favorites." He called his covers of songs such as "O Holy Night" to be "first rate treatments." They also praised Pride's original material that was also included on the album. The online music publication, Ultimate Twang, reviewed the original LP as well and also gave it a positive reception. Writers commented that it was "an excellent album, by one of the best country singers of all-time." The re-released version of the album was reviewed by Allmusic's David A. Milberg, who rated it 4.5 out of 5 stars. "The title tune was a great Christmas hit. This is mellow C&W for the holidays," he wrote.

Release
Christmas in My Home Town was originally released in November 1970 on RCA Victor Studios. It was Pride's ninth studio recording in his career. The project was originally distributed as a vinyl LP, containing five songs on either side of the record. The album was then re-released on a compact disc in 2013, and featured three additional holiday tracks that first been recorded for various Christmas compilations. The newer version featured re-mastering and production as well. The re-release was issued on Music City Records, Pride's record label at the time. The re-released version was also issued to digital and streaming services, which included Apple Music. The title track was the album's only single. It was released in November 1970. The single received significant holiday airplay and became one of the year's top holiday tunes.

Track listings

Vinyl version

Digital and compact disc versions

Personnel
All credits are adapted from the 2013 liner notes of Christmas in My Home Town.

Musical personnel

 Willie Ackerman – drums
 Beegie Adair – piano
 Doris Allen – violin
 Joseph Babcock – background vocals
 Bobby Becker – violin
 George Binkley – violin
 Harold Bradley – guitar
 David Briggs – piano, keyboards
 Mark Casstevens – guitar
 Jimmy Colvard – bass
 Pete Drake – steel guitar
 Ray Edenton – guitar
 Dolores Edgin – background vocals
 Jack Eubanks – guitar
 Solie Fott – viola
 Sonny Garrish – steel guitar
 Johnny Gimble – fiddle
 Billy Grammer – rhythm guitar
 Lloyd Green – steel guitar
 Milton Hackney – violin
 Rob Hajacos – fiddle
 Buddy Harman – drums
 Hoyt Hawkins – background vocals
 Mitch Humphries – keyboards
 David Hungate – bass
 Junior Huskey – bass
 William Irwin – organ
 Jimmy Isabelle – drums
 The Jordanaires – background vocals

 Millie Kirkham – background vocals
 Neal Matthews – background vocals
 Terry McMillan – background vocals
 Farrell Morris – bells, percussion, vibraphone
 Robert Mowrey – viola
 The Nashville Edition – background vocals
 Fred Newell – guitar
 June Page – background vocals
 Jo Parker – violin
 Larry Paxton – bass
 Gary Prim – keyboards
 Hargus "Pig" Robbins – piano
 Brent Rowan – guitar
 Billy Sanford – bass, electric guitar
 Dale Sellers – electric guitar
 Lisa Silver – background vocals
 Buddy Spicher – fiddle
 Bobby Thompson – guitar
 David Vaderkool – cello
 Pete Wade – guitar
 Carol Walker – violin
 Raymond Walker – background vocals
 Gary Williams – cello
 Bergen White – bells
 Chip Young – guitar
 Curtis Young – background vocals
 Joe Zinkan – bass

Technical personnel
 Jack Clement – producer
 Doug Crider – assistant engineer
 Greg Gosselin – art direction, design, liner notes, project supervisor
 Bill Harris – engineer
 Jack D. Johnson – arranger
 Les Ladd – recording technician
 Blake Mevis – producer
 Jimmy Moore – cover photo
 Al Pachucki – engineer
 Tom Pick – engineer
 Roy Shockley – recording technician
 Bergen White – arranger
 M.G. Wilder – mastering
 Norro Wilson – producer

Certifications

Release history

References

1970 albums
Albums produced by Jack Clement
Charley Pride albums
Christmas albums by American artists
RCA Records Christmas albums